Chaudhuria is a genus of spineless eels native to Southeast Asia.

Species
There are currently three recognized species in this genus:
 Chaudhuria caudata Annandale, 1918 (Burmese spineless eel)
 Chaudhuria fusipinnis Kottelat & Britz, 2000
 Chaudhuria ritvae Britz, 2010

References

Chaudhuriidae